The wedding of Hussein, Crown Prince of Jordan, and Rajwa Al Saif will take place on 1 June 2023 in the Hashemite Kingdom of Jordan. Hussein is the eldest son and heir of King Abdullah II and Queen Rania of Jordan. Al Saif is the youngest daughter of Saudi businessman Khaled Al Saif and Azza Al Sudairi .

Engagement
The couple's engagement was announced by the Royal Hashemite Court on Twitter on 17 August 2022. The engagement ceremony took place at the home of Al Saif's father in Riyadh and was attended by members of the Jordanian royal family, namely the King and Queen, Prince Hassan bin Talal, Prince Hashem bin Abdullah, Prince Ali bin Hussein, Prince Hashim bin Hussein, Prince Ghazi bin Muhammad, Prince Rashid bin Hassan, and members of the Al Saif family. For the engagement ceremony, Al Saif wore an embroidered abaya from Lebanese brand Orient 499 with a bronze belt borrowed from her future mother-in-law, Queen Rania. Queen Rania also lent Al Saif a pair of white gold and yellow diamond Stephen Webster for one of the engagement portraits.

Crown Prince Hussein presented Al Saif with a pear-cut diamond Harry Winston ring.

Queen Rania shared her congratulations on Instagram, stating "I didn't think it was possible to hold so much joy in my heart! Congratulations to my eldest Prince Hussein and his beautiful bride-to-be, Rajwa". 

On 31 December 2022, the Royal Hashemite Court announced that the wedding will take place on 1 June 2023.

References

Hussein
Hussein
Ceremonies in Jordan
Jordanian monarchy
2023 in Jordan